Bovard is an unincorporated community in Butler County, Pennsylvania, United States.

References

Unincorporated communities in Butler County, Pennsylvania
Unincorporated communities in Pennsylvania